Piotr Albiński (born 7 October 1969) is a Polish freestyle swimmer. He competed in two events at the 1992 Summer Olympics.

References

External links
 

1969 births
Living people
Polish male freestyle swimmers
Olympic swimmers of Poland
Swimmers at the 1992 Summer Olympics
Sportspeople from Szczecin
20th-century Polish people